Michael Müller (born 4 April 1964) is a German former footballer who played as a sweeper.

References

External links
 Profile on kicker.de
 Profile on DFB.de

1964 births
Living people
Sportspeople from Mainz
Footballers from Rhineland-Palatinate
German footballers
Association football sweepers
1. FSV Mainz 05 players
SV Wehen Wiesbaden players
2. Bundesliga players